Bheramara is an upazila of Kushtia District in the Division of Khulna, Bangladesh. The upazila is beside the Padma River, and the important Hardinge Bridge crosses the river between Bheramara Upazila and Ishurdi Upazila of Pabna District.

Geography

It has 26384 households and total area 153.72 km2.

Bheramara sub-district is located within Kushtia district, Bangladesh and falls roughly within 23° 40′ – 24° 10′
N and 88° 45′ – 89° 20′ E. The town of Bheramara has an area of 3.26 km2 and a population of 20,676.
Agriculture is the main occupation of the people and the major crops are paddy, wheat, mustard, sweet potato,
sunflower, onion, garlic, betel leaf, tobacco, and sugarcane. The survey was conducted in Bheramara town and
its immediate vicinity.

Demographics
According to 2011 Bangladesh census, Bhermara had a population of 200,084. Males constituted 49.39% of the population and females 50.61. Muslims formed 97.760% of the population, Hindus 2.216%, Christians 0.005% and others 0.019%. Bheramara had a literacy rate of 48.74% for the population 7 years and above.

As of the 1991 Bangladesh census, Bheramara had a population of 144,221. Males constituted 51.55% of the population, and females 48.45%. This Upazila's eighteen up population was 72,279. Bheramara had an average literacy rate of 28.1% (7+ years), compared to the national average of 32.4% literate.

Administration
Bheramara Upazila is divided into Bheramara Municipality and six union parishads: Bhadarpur, Bahir Char, Chandgram, Dharmapur, Juniadaha, and Mokarimpur. The union parishads are subdivided into 43 mauzas and 78 villages.

Bheramara Municipality is subdivided into 9 wards and 15 mahallas.

See also
 Upazilas of Bangladesh
 Districts of Bangladesh
 Divisions of Bangladesh

References

Upazilas of Kushtia District
Kushtia District
Khulna Division